Barsine linga is a moth of the family Erebidae. It was described by Frederic Moore in 1859. It is found in Pakistan, India, China and Thailand.

References

Moths of Asia
Nudariina
Moths described in 1859